Basia Kenneth Makepe (born 4 March 1991) is a Mosotho footballer who plays as a centre back for Lesotho Premier League club Lesotho Mounted Police Service FC and the Lesotho national team.

References

External links

1991 births
Living people
Lesotho footballers
Association football central defenders
Lioli FC players
Lesotho international footballers